Christmas with Etta Jones is a Christmas album by vocalist Etta Jones which was recorded in 1990 and released on the Muse label.

Reception

The AllMusic review by Scott Yanow stated "The fine vocalist Etta Jones sings nine mostly-familiar Christmas-related songs on this 1990 CD. Nothing all that memorable occurs ... but the overall results are pleasing".

Track listing
 "It's Christmas Time" (Gloria Coleman) – 4:27		
 "Have Yourself a Merry Little Christmas" (Hugh Martin, Ralph Blane) – 5:06		
 "Santa Claus Is Coming to Town" (John Frederick Coots, Haven Gillespie) – 8:41		
 "The Christmas Song" (Bob Wells, Mel Tormé) – 5:15
 "Merry Christmas Baby" (Lou Baxter, Johnny Moore) – 5:29		
 "What Are You Doing New Year's Eve?" (Frank Loesser) – 7:53
 "Ring the Bells" (Coleman) – 3:54
 "(I'm Dreaming of a) White Christmas" (Irving Berlin) – 3:37
 "I'll Be Home for Christmas" (Walter Kent, Buck Ram, Kim Gannon) – 3:10 Bonus track on CD reissue

Personnel
Etta Jones – vocals
Johnny Coles – flugelhorn (tracks 1, 5 & 7)
Bill Easley – tenor saxophone, flute (tracks 1, 5 & 7)
Houston Person – tenor saxophone (tracks 2–4 & 8)
Randy Johnston – guitar
Stan Hope – piano (tracks 2–4 & 8)
Horace Ott – keyboards (tracks 1, 5 & 7)
George Devens – vibraphone
Wilbur Bascomb – bass
Cecil Brooks III – drums
Sammy Figueroa – congas, percussion (tracks 1, 5 & 7)

References

Muse Records albums
Etta Jones albums
Albums recorded at Van Gelder Studio
1990 Christmas albums